Boč, also called the Triglav of Slovene Styria ,  is a  mountain in eastern Slovenia. It belongs to the municipalities of Poljčane (the peak) and Rogaška Slatina (southern slope). Boč, which is among the southernmost extensions of the Karawanks mountain range, is the central mountain of the Boč–Donatus Mountain Landscape Park. It has two peaks, which are five minutes apart. At one peak, there are transmitters (restricted military area). In the other, a  lookout tower has stood since 1962. The mountain, covered with forest and protected as a natural park, has a number of trails that vary in difficulty level and is also home to the protected Greater Pasque Flower.  The plant grows in the vicinity of St. Nicholas Church (Parish of Kostrivnica) and the Hut Under Mt. Boč on the southern slope of Boč. A sculpture of the Greater Pasque Flower, work of the sculptor Franc Tobias from Razvanje, has been put on display on a small rise near its growing place.

References

External links

Mountains of Styria (Slovenia)
Karawanks
Municipality of Poljčane
Municipality of Rogaška Slatina
Mountains under 1000 metres
Mountains of the Alps